The 1920–21 Eintracht Frankfurt season was the 21st season in the club's football history. 
It was the first full season under the name Eintracht after merging of Frankfurter FV and the gymnastics club Frankfurter Turngemeinde von 1861.

In 1920–21 the club played in the Kreisliga Nordmain, the top tier of German football. It was the club's 2nd season in the Kreisliga Nordmain.

The season ended up with Eintracht winning Kreisliga Nordmain for the second time in a row. In the northern section of the South German championship group Eintracht didn't qualify for the championship knockout stage.

Matches

Legend

Friendlies

Kreisliga Nordmain

League fixtures and results

League table

Results summary

Results by round

South German championship round (Northern section)

Fixtures and results

Table

South German Cup DFB-Pokal / SFV-Pokal

Squad

Squad and statistics

|}

Transfers

In:

Out:

Notes

See also
 1921 German football championship

Sources

External links
 Official English Eintracht website 
 German archive site 

1920-21
German football clubs 1920–21 season